Bird dropping spider is a common name for several spiders and may refer to:

Arkys curtulus
Celaenia excavata, a species native to eastern Australia
Mastophora, a genus native to the New World

Arthropod common names
Set index articles on spiders